Flexeiras is a municipality located in the Brazilian state of Alagoas. Its population is 12,807 (2020) and its area is 316 km².

The municipality contains 38% of the  Murici Ecological Station, created in 2001.

References

Municipalities in Alagoas